Nicolas de Plattemontagne, originally Nicolas Van Plattenberg (19 November 1631, Paris - 25 December 1706) was a French painter and engraver. His name also appears as La Montagne, Montagne and Montaigne.

Biography 
His father was the Flemish painter and engraver Matthieu van Plattenberg, originally from Antwerp, who specialized in maritime scenes. In addition, his uncle was the engraver, Jean Morin, who gave him his first lessons in that subject.

In his youth, after learning the basics from his father, he studied with Philippe de Champaigne, one of the greatest painters and engravers in the Classical style. He also became a collaborator in the workshop belonging to Champaigne's nephew, Jean-Baptiste, who also became his lifelong friend. For many years, some of Plattemontagne's early works were confused with those by both of the Champaignes, and it is only rather recently that the confusion has been resolved.

From 1865 to 1656, under the direction of the elder, Champaigne, he participated in decorating the apartments of Anne of Austria at the abbey of Val-de-Grâce.

In 1663, he was accepted as a history painter at the Académie royale de peinture et de sculpture, and was later named a Professor. Previously, he had focused on portraits. Three years later, he was chosen to create the annual painting for the "Mays", commissioned by the Goldsmiths' Guild of Paris for Notre Dame Cathedral. He produced a "Saint Paul and Silas", which is now at the Louvre. In 1669, he was hired to decorate the apartments of Louis, the Dauphin at the Palais des Tuileries.

In 1703, Jean Ranc painted his portrait at the Château de Versailles. That painting served as Ranc's reception piece for acceptance at the Académie.

He was largely forgotten within a few years of his death. After some research around the turn of the 20th century, resulting in several reattributions, his corpus appears to comprise seventeen paintings and about eighty engravings or drawings.

Selected works

Further reading 
 Dominique Brême and Frédérique Lanoë, À l’école de Philippe de Champaigne, Somogy éditions d’art, 2007 
 Frédérique Lanoë, Pierre Rosenberg, Philippe Luez, Trois maîtres du dessin, Philippe de Champaigne, Jean-Baptiste de Champaigne, Nicolas de Plattemontagne, Éditions de la RMN, 2009

External links 

 "Un tableau de Nicolas de Plattemontagne acquis par Bâle" @ La Tribune de l'art.

1631 births
1706 deaths
French painters
French engravers
Members of the Académie royale de peinture et de sculpture
Artists from Paris
House of Plettenberg